Oegoconia ceres is a moth of the family Autostichidae. It is found on Sardinia.

The length of the forewings is 10–15 mm. The forewings are dark greyish brown with ochreous yellow markings. The hindwings are grey-brown.

Etymology
The species is named for the Roman goddess Ceres.

References

Moths described in 2007
Oegoconia
Moths of Europe